Desire is a 1936 American romantic crime comedy-drama film directed by Frank Borzage, starring Marlene Dietrich and Gary Cooper, and produced by Borzage and Ernst Lubitsch. The picture is a remake of the 1933 German film Happy Days in Aranjuez. The screenplay was written by Samuel Hoffenstein, Edwin Justus Mayer, and Waldemar Young, based on the play Die Schönen Tage von Aranjuez by Hans Székely and Robert A. Stemmle. The music score was composed by Frederick Hollander and the cinematography was shot by Charles Lang and Victor Milner. Marlene Dietrich's wardrobe was designed by Travis Banton. The supporting cast features John Halliday, William Frawley, Akim Tamiroff, and Alan Mowbray.

Plot
In Paris, Madeleine de Beaupre cons jeweler Aristide Duvalle and psychiatrist Maurice Pauquet by telling each man that she is married to the other. Duvalle delivers a string of pearls worth millions of francs to Pauquet's office, expecting to be paid, but Pauquet thinks he is a new patient who has delusions of needing to collect debts. Madeleine is there to introduce them to each other, and departs with the pearls before they figure out what she has done.

While driving to the Spanish border, Madeleine splashes mud onto Tom Bradley, an American automotive engineer vacationing in Europe. Then as they approach the border, her car's horn control sticks "on", to the annoyance of the customs officers. Tom fixes it and they go into the office together.  Luggage and purses are being inspected, so she decides to hide the pearls in his jacket pocket. On the road, she pulls ahead of Tom, then disables her own car so that he will have to give her a lift.

But he has changed jackets. She says she is going to San Sebastián, and he offers to drive her there. En route she seizes an opportunity to steal his car, leaving him standing in the road—along with the suitcase his other jacket is in. She then crashes the car while evading police.

They make their way separately to San Sebastián. There "Countess" de Beaupre meets her accomplice, supposedly her uncle, "Prince" Carlos Margoli. Tom locates Madeleine with the help of a policeman, who cannot imagine that a charming countess would steal a car and does not even stay to see if Tom identifies her as the thief.

As it seems that Tom still has the pearls but does not know it, Carlos quickly offers to pay for the car, and Madeleine pretends to be attracted to him. They all become friendly and go together to stay at Carlos's villa. There, when Tom wears his other jacket, Carlos gets the pearls from him using another trick.

Carlos now wants Madeleine to accompany him to Madrid to sell them, but she has actually fallen in love with Tom, and wants to leave the gang instead. Despite the attempts of Carlos and "Aunt" Olga, another gang member, to break them up, they become engaged.

After Carlos and Olga taunt Madeleine about being unable to tell Tom the truth about herself, she throws caution to the wind and does just that. They steal the necklace back from Carlos and return to Paris, where Madeleine returns it to Duvalle. He personally forgives her, but says she must still face the authorities. The final scene is Tom and Madeleine's wedding, where her parole document is accidentally shown, proving that she has done so. Pauquet and Duvalle, who now is his patient, attend the wedding as witnesses.

Cast
 Marlene Dietrich as Madeleine de Beaupre
 Gary Cooper as Tom Bradley
 John Halliday as Carlos Margoli
 William Frawley as Mr. Gibson
 Ernest Cossart as Aristide Duvalle
 Akim Tamiroff as Avilia, Police Official
 Alan Mowbray as Dr. Maurice Pauquet
 Zeffie Tilbury as Aunt Olga

Background

John Gilbert was initially cast as Carlos Margoli, which was to be his comeback role. He had a heart attack in his dressing room a few weeks later and was immediately replaced by John Halliday. A few days later, Gilbert died of alcohol-induced heart failure. Some of the scenes in the film were directed by Ernst Lubitsch whilst Frank Borzage was fulfilling a prior commitment at Warner Bros. The film was shot at Paramount Studios and at the Iverson Movie Ranch in Chatsworth, California, and, unusual for its time, on location in France and Spain.

Of the film, Dietrich said:
The only film I need not be ashamed of is Desire, directed by Frank Borzage and based on a script by Ernst Lubitsch. I found Gary Cooper a little less monosyllabic than before. He was finally rid of Lupe Vélez, who had been at his heels constantly throughout the shooting of Morocco.
and: 
Desire became a good film and, moreover, also proved to be a box-office success. The script was excellent, the roles superb – one more proof that these elements are more important than actors.

Accolades
Writing for The Spectator in 1936, Graham Greene gave the film a good review, describing it as "the best film in which Miss Marlene Dietrich has appeared since she left Germany, and the most amusing new film to be seen in London this week". Greene also praised Cooper's performance as one of his best.

The film is recognized by American Film Institute in these lists:
 2002: AFI's 100 Years...100 Passions – Nominated

Footnotes

External links
 
 
 
 
 
 Desire at Virtual History

1936 films
1936 comedy-drama films
1936 crime drama films
1936 romantic comedy films
1936 romantic drama films
1930s American films
1930s crime comedy-drama films
1930s English-language films
1930s romantic comedy-drama films
American black-and-white films
American crime comedy-drama films
American films based on plays
American remakes of German films
American romantic comedy-drama films
Films about jewellery
Films about theft
Films directed by Frank Borzage
Films produced by Frank Borzage
Films set in the Basque County
Films set in Paris
Films shot in Los Angeles
Films shot in Paris
Films shot in Spain
Paramount Pictures films
Romantic crime films